Platycarya strobilacea is a species of flowering plant in the family Juglandaceae, formerly treated as comprising the single living species in Platycarya, though a second living species Platycarya longzhouensis is now recognized. It is native to eastern Asia in China, Korea, and Japan.

It is a deciduous tree growing to 15 m tall. The leaves are usually pinnate, 15–30 cm long with 7–15 leaflets (rarely simple, or with up to 23 leaflets), the terminal leaflet present; the leaflets are 3–11 cm long and 1.5–3.5 cm broad. The flowers are catkins; the male (pollen) catkins are 2–15 cm long, the female catkins 2.5–5 cm long at maturity, hard and woody, superficially resembling a conifer cone with spirally arranged scales. Galloyl pedunculagin can be found in P. strobilacea.

References 

Juglandoideae
Flora of China
Flora of Japan
Trees of Korea